Hardouin is used as both a surname and a given name. Notable people with the name include:

 Hardouin (archbishop), Archbishop of Tours from 960 to 980
 Hardouin de Graetz, or Ortwin (1475–1542), German scholar and theologian
 Hardouin Mansart, or Jules Hardouin Mansart (1646–1708), French architect
 Charles Hardouin (1694-1718), French operatic baritone 
 Jean Hardouin (1646–1729), French classical scholar
 Jean-Louis Hardouin Michelin de Choisy, French malacologist and palaeontologist
 Maria Le Hardouin (1912-1967), Swiss French-speaking writer and woman of letters